Debra Louise Jackson (September 23, 1956 – October 30 or 31, 1979), informally known as "Orange Socks" when unidentified, was an American murder victim who went unidentified for nearly 40 years before being identified via a DNA match with her surviving sister in 2019. Her murder is believed to have taken place on October 30 or 31, 1979, in Georgetown, Texas. Her body was found naked, except for the pair of orange socks from which the nickname was derived. She had been strangled, and was believed to have died only hours before the discovery.

Henry Lee Lucas confessed to and was convicted of her murder. Though doubts have been raised about his complicity in this crime, Lucas's conviction was not overturned. His death sentence was commuted by then-Texas governor George W. Bush in 1998; Lucas died in prison in 2001. There is strong evidence that Lucas was in Florida when Jackson was murdered.

Evidence and physical description
Jackson, who had been sexually assaulted, was found in a culvert on Interstate 35, having been dragged to and thrown over a guardrail. The cause of death was ruled as strangulation, as a large amount of bruising was visible on her neck. Other bruises were also visible, caused by her body having been dropped from the overpass, after being dragged through a patch of grass. Blood stains were also present at the scene. The victim was initially estimated to be in her twenties at the time of her death. Several other murders had taken place along the same interstate in Travis County, Texas, which police stated may have been connected to the then-unidentified victim.

Jackson's legs were unshaven, with a large number of insect bites. She had long toenails, her fingernails were painted and a hairline scar was observed beneath the chin. The victim's earlobes were noted to be "unique" and her toes were noted to be longer than average. Despite her injuries, she had not broken a bone during her life. She had reportedly suffered from salpingitis due to contracting gonorrhea. She had ten-inch-long brown hair with a reddish tint, hazel eyes, and her age ranged from 15 to 30 years. She was approximately five feet eight inches to five feet ten inches tall, and weighed between 140 and 160 pounds. Two of her teeth were missing; the remainder were well-maintained, although they showed little sign of dental treatment. A silver ring was found on her hand, containing an abalone or mother of pearl stone. Her ears were pierced.

A towel was found at the scene along with her body, which she may have been using as a makeshift sanitary napkin. One of two matchbooks found at the scene belonged to a hotel from Henryetta, Oklahoma, which supported the theory she was a hitchhiker or drifter.

Confession by Henry Lee Lucas

In 1982, serial killer Henry Lee Lucas confessed to her murder, although there was no physical evidence that he had been involved in the killing, sexual assault or disposing of the body. In an interview, he stated that he picked her up in Oklahoma, where they had sex. He asked her for sex again while he was driving; he claimed that at this, Debra said "not right now" and attempted to leave his car, at which point he killed her and raped her corpse. He then drove her body to Georgetown. Lucas told authorities that the victim had stated her name as being "Joanie" or "Judy". He had previously showed officers how he had supposedly dragged her body over the guardrail when taken to the location where her body was found.

One report claims that at the time of Jackson's murder, Lucas was working in Florida, whereas the murder took place in Texas. Interrogators also stated that he had contradicted himself several times when confessing to the murder, and his defense also stated that he was shown images of the crime scene before his interview. In order to have traveled to Oklahoma, to Texas and back to Florida, it was estimated that he would have had to drive at an average of seventy miles an hour, without stopping, which many find unlikely. Lucas later recanted this statement after his conviction in 1984 and, by involvement of the state governor, George W. Bush, his death sentence was reduced to life imprisonment, as Jackson's murder was the only case that resulted in his receiving the death penalty. Lucas had a history of dubious confessions, something that led others to doubt his truthfulness (he confessed to upwards of 3,000 murders). Lucas recanted his confessions, stating that the only murder he had committed was that of his mother, Viola.

Media appearances and further investigation

In 2001, a missing woman's photograph surfaced that resembled the decedent, but DNA testing did not match. Another media report suggested that "Orange Socks" was a woman who had disappeared in the 1970s, together with her abusive boyfriend. There was some speculation that "Orange Socks" was Martha Morrison, but she was eventually ruled out. In 2015, Morrison's remains were later identified as a Jane Doe found in Washington the same year she disappeared. Several other missing women were also excluded.

The "Orange Socks" case was featured twice on the TV series America's Most Wanted. An anonymous woman called to the program on one occasion saying she had seen "Orange Socks" hitchhiking on the day of her murder, but the lead did not generate any new information.

In 2016, on the 37th anniversary of her discovery, new sketches of "Orange Socks" were released by the National Center for Missing & Exploited Children. The organization also entered her into their database.

In May 2018, law enforcement announced that they were examining the victim's ring as well as running tests to identify where the victim's socks were made. A book of matches found near the body was traced to a hotel in Oklahoma but did not identify anyone matching her description.

By January 2019, it was announced that DNA from Jackson's socks contained the profiles of two or more males. It is unknown if the evidence will be enough for further examination. The DNA was recovered from fingernail scrapings as well as pubic hair samples.

Identification
In August 2019, "Orange Socks" was identified as Debra Jackson. The DNA Doe Project had identified a potential cousin of "Orange Socks" through their research. A revised sketch (by forensic artist Natalie Murry) had also caught the attention of Jackson's sister. Members of Jackson's family visually identified the decedent based on morgue photographs and physical characteristics. Jackson's sister then submitted a saliva-based DNA kit and the results confirmed the two were related. Jackson was last seen around 1977 and had never been reported missing. Further investigation found that Jackson had worked at the Ramada Inn in Amarillo, Texas and Bur-Mont (an assisted living facility) in Azle, Texas in 1978. Law enforcement also stated that they believe she worked at R.E. West and C.G. Cole Admiral PTR, Realty Investment LTD in 1979, in an unknown location.

Many other details about her life also remain unclear, but it is known she attended school locally and may have used the alias surnames "Moon" and "Larned".

See also

List of solved missing person cases
List of unsolved murders
Murder of Sherri Jarvis, a formerly unidentified female found a year and one day later in Huntsville, Texas.

References

External links

1979 in Texas
1979 murders in the United States
1970s crimes in Texas
1970s missing person cases
Deaths by person in Texas
False confessions
Georgetown, Texas
Incidents of violence against women
Missing person cases in Texas
October 1979 crimes
October 1979 events in the United States
Sexual assaults in the United States
Unsolved murders in the United States
Violence against women in the United States
Female murder victims
History of women in Texas